The Pointe du Toulinguet is a promontory at the end of the Crozon peninsula in the commune of Camaret-sur-Mer in France, in western Brittany.

Its known fortifications include a prehistoric fortified site, as well as a lower battery by Vauban (of which only the platform remains).  It is also the site of a model-tower number 3, with a surrounding wall, 4 batteries built in 1883 and 1899, a 1949 signal station still in use and an 1848 lighthouse.  It is still military land and closed to the public.

Notes

Fortifications of Brest, France
Landforms of Finistère
Tourist attractions in Finistère
Headlands of Brittany